Iverson Minter (March 23, 1932 – February 25, 2012), known as Louisiana Red, was an American blues guitarist, harmonica player, and singer, who recorded more than 50 albums. He was best known for his song "Sweet Blood Call".

Biography
Born in Bessemer, Alabama, Minter lost his parents early in life; his mother died of pneumonia shortly after his birth, and his father was lynched by the Ku Klux Klan in 1937. He was brought up by a series of relatives in various towns and cities. Red recorded for Chess in 1949, before joining the Army. He was trained as a parachutist with the 82nd Airborne and was sent to Korea in 1951. The 82nd Airborne was not deployed as a complete unit in Korea, but soldiers from this unit were dispatched as Rangers in the 2nd, 3rd and 7th Infantry Divisions. Minter said he was assigned to the 3rd Infantry Division.

After leaving the Army, he played with John Lee Hooker in Detroit for two years in the late 1950s. He recorded for Checker Records in 1952, billed as Rocky Fuller.

His first album, Lowdown Back Porch Blues, was recorded in New York City with Tommy Tucker and released in 1963. His second album, Seventh Son, was released later the same year. Louisiana Red released the single "I'm Too Poor to Die" for the Glover label in 1964. It peaked at number 117 on the Billboard Hot 100 and number 30 on the Cashbox chart. (Billboard did not publish an R&B chart in 1964.)

He maintained a busy recording and performing schedule through the 1960s and 1970s, working in sessions for Chess, Checker, Atlas, Glover, Roulette, L&R and Tomato, amongst others. In 1983 he won a W. C. Handy Award for Best Traditional Blues Male Artist. He lived in Hanover, Germany, from 1981.

He appeared in the films Rockpalast (1976), Comeback (1982), Ballhaus Barmbek (1988), Red and Blues (2005) and Family Meeting (2008).

In 1994, Louisiana Red fused the blues with the urban Greek music of the bouzouki player Stelios Vamvakaris, on the album Blues Meets Rembetika. He continued to tour, including regular returns to the United States, until his death. In 2011, Louisiana Red released the album Memphis Mojo, to broad public acclaim.

Death
Michael Messer noted on February 25, 2012, "I am very sorry to be bringer of such sad news that my dear friend, Louisiana Red, died this morning. He had a stroke on Monday and had been in a coma." He died in Hanover, aged 79.

Awards
 W. C. Handy Award for Best Traditional Blues Male Artist, 1983
Lifetime Achievement Award, Blues Trust Productions, 2006
 Grand Prix du Disque (Blues) for Back to the Black Bayou, 2009
 German Record Critics Award (2nd quarter) for Best New Release (Blues), 2009
 Bluesnews Poll for Back to the Black Bayou, 2009
 Blues Music Award for Acoustic Album of the Year (You Got to Move), 2010

Discography

Albums
 Lowdown Back Porch Blues (1963, Roulette)
 Seventh Son (1963, Carnival) [this is a 1972 reissue of Lowdown Back Porch Blues with Glover single 3002 added]
 Shouts the Blues (1970, Forum Circle) [this is a 1970 reissue of Lowdown Back Porch Blues with the last two tracks deleted]
 Louisiana Red Sings the Blues (1972, Atlantic)
 Sweet Blood Call (1975, Blue Labor)
 Dead Stray Dog (1976, Blue Labor)
 New York Blues (1979, L+R)
 Reality Blues (1980, L+R)
 High Voltage Blues, with Sugar Blue (1980, Black Panther)
 Midnight Rambler (1982, Tomato/Rhino)
 Blues for Ida B (1982, JSP)
 Boy from Black Bayou (1983, L+R)
 Blues from the Heart (1983, JSP)
 Anti Nuclear Blues (1983, L+R)
 Bluesman (1984, JSP)
 Back to the Road Again (1984, MMG)
 My Life, with Carey Bell (1984, L+R)
 World on Fire (1985, MMG)
 Brothers in Blues (1985, CMA)
 Back to the Roots (1987, CMA)
 Last Mohican of the Blues (1992, Polton)
 Ashland Avenue Blues (1992, Schubert)
 Always Played the Blues (1994, JSP)
 Louisiana Red (1994, Forum)
 Blues Meets Rembetika (1994, Distazi)
 Sittin' Here Wonderin''' (1995, Earwig Music)
 Sugar Hips (1995, CMA)
 Rising Sun Collection (1996, JAMR)
 I Hear the Train Coming (1997, Chrisly)
 Over My Head (1997, Chrisly)
 Walked All Night Long with Lefty Dizz, originally recorded in 1976 (1997, Blues Alliance)
 Rip Off Blues (1998, Chrisly)
 Winter & Summer Sessions (1998, Blues Factory)
 Driftin' (1999, Earwig Music)
 Millennium Blues (1999, Earwig Music)
 Sings Deep Blues (2001, P-Vine)
 A Different Shade of Red (2002, Severn)
 No Turn on Red (2005, Hightone)
 Hot Sauce (2005, Red Lightnin')
 Back to the Black Bayou, with Kim Wilson and Little Victor (2008, Bluestown)
 You Got to Move, with David Maxwell (2009, Blu Max/Vizztone)
 Memphis Mojo, with Little Victor (2011, Ruf)
 When My Mama Was Living (2012, Labor Records; recorded 1975)

Live albums
 Live & Well (1976, Ornament)
 King Bee, with Sugar Blue (1978, Orchid)
 Red, Funk and Blue, with Sugar Blue (1978, Black Panther)
 Live in Montreux (2000, Labor)
 Live at 55, with Carey Bell (1994, Enja)
 Bad Case of the Blues, with Carey Bell (2004, Mojo Tone)
 Live at Painted Sky (2008, Paul Productions)
 Red Funk 'n Blue: The Complete 1978 Recordings [with Sugar Blue] (2021, JSP Records)

Compilation albums
 Anthologie du Blues, vol. 11 (Roulette)
 Blues Classics (1983, L+R)
 Pretty Woman (1991, Blues Beacon)
 The Best of Louisiana Red (1995, Evidence)
 The Blues Spectrum of Louisiana Red, with Sugar Blue (1998, JSP)
 The Sky Is Crying (2014, Wolf Records)

Guest appearances (selected)
 Carey Bell, Brought Up the Hard Way Eric Burdon, Comeback Kent Cooper, The Blues and Other Songs Bob Corritore, Harmonica Blues Champion Jack Dupree, After All John Lee Hooker, Down Child Albert King, Blues Guitar Killers, with Johnny Winter and Rory Gallagher
 Albert King, Live Brownie McGhee, Rainy Day Roswell Rudd, Blown Bone Johnny Shines, Too Wet to Plow Sunnyland Slim, Decoration Day Roosevelt Sykes, Boogie & Blues Roosevelt Sykes, Music Is My Business Wentus Blues Band, Family AlbumVarious artists (selected)
 The Paul Jones Rhythm & Blues Show – The American Guests (JSP CD210)
 The Paul Jones Rhythm & Blues Show – The American Guests, vol. 3 (JSP CD235)
 Chicago Blues, vol. 2
 Earwig 16. Ann. Sampler (1995, Earwig Music)
 Earwig 20. Ann. Sampler (2000, Earwig Music)
 American Folk Blues Festival (1980, 1983, L+R)
 The 1. Blues Sampler (1980, L+R)
 Blues Legends – Blues Giants  (1993, Castle Communications)
 Live at Boston Blues Festival, vol. 2 (2007, Blues Trust)
 Family Meeting, Wentus Blues Band with Mick Taylor and Lazy Lester (2008, Ruf)
 Blues Wire Birthday Tour (Greece, 2007)
 Houserockin' and Blues Shoutin – Rhythm Room 15 Year Anniversary Album'' (2006, Blue Witch Records)

References

External links
Official website
Earwig Music label website
Louisiana Red profile, Ponderosa Stomp

Pittsburgh Music History profile of Louisiana Red

1932 births
2012 deaths
People from Bessemer, Alabama
African-American male singer-songwriters
American blues guitarists
American male guitarists
American blues singer-songwriters
Louisiana blues musicians
Contemporary blues musicians
Country blues musicians
20th-century African-American male singers
African-American guitarists
American blues harmonica players
American expatriates in Germany
Chess Records artists
Blues musicians from Louisiana
Singer-songwriters from Louisiana
Guitarists from Alabama
Guitarists from Louisiana
20th-century American guitarists
JSP Records artists
Earwig Music artists
Ruf Records artists
21st-century African-American male singers
Singer-songwriters from Alabama